Job 39 is the 39th chapter of the Book of Job in the Hebrew Bible or the Old Testament of the Christian Bible. The book is anonymous; most scholars believe it was written around 6th century BCE. This chapter records the speech of God to Job, which belongs to the "Verdicts" section of the book, comprising Job 32:1–42:6.

Text
The original text is written in Hebrew language. This chapter is divided into 30 verses.

Textual witnesses
Some early manuscripts containing the text of this chapter in Hebrew are of the Masoretic Text, which includes the Aleppo Codex (10th century), and Codex Leningradensis (1008).

There is also a translation into Koine Greek known as the Septuagint, made in the last few centuries BC; some extant ancient manuscripts of this version include Codex Vaticanus (B; B; 4th century), Codex Sinaiticus (S; BHK: S; 4th century), and Codex Alexandrinus (A; A; 5th century).

Analysis
The structure of the book is as follows:
The Prologue (chapters 1–2)
The Dialogue (chapters 3–31)
The Verdicts (32:1–42:6)
The Epilogue (42:7–17)

Within the structure, chapter 39 is grouped into the Verdict section with the following outline:
Elihu's Verdict (32:1–37:24)
God's Appearance (Yahweh Speeches) and Job's Responses (38:1–42:6)
God's First Speech (38:1–40:2)
Theme Verse and Summons (38:1–3)
The Physical World (38:4–38)
The Physical Earth (38:4–7)
The Sea (38:8–11)
The Morning (38:12–15)
The Outer Limits of the Earth (38:16–18)
Light and Darkness (38:19–21)
The Waters – Snow, Hail, Rain, Frost, Ice (38:22–30)
The Heavenly Bodies (38:31–33)
Storms (38:34–38)
The Animal World (38:39–40:2)
God Provides for the Lions and Ravens (38:39–41)
The Mountain Goats (39:1–4)
The Wild Donkey (39:5–8)
The Wild Ox (39:9–12)
The Ostrich (39:13–18)
The Warhorse (39:19–25)
The Hawk and the Eagle (39:26–30)
Brief Challenge to Answer (40:1–2)
Job's First Reply – An Insufficient Response (40:3–5)
God's Second Speech (40:6–41:34)
Job's Second Reply (42:1–6)

God's speeches in chapters 38–41 can be split in two parts, both starting with almost identical phrases and having a similar structure:

The revelation of the Lord to Job is the culmination of the book of Job, that the Lord speaks directly to Job and displays his sovereign power and glory. Job has lived through the suffering—without cursing God, holding his integrity, and nowhere regretted it – but he was unaware of the real reason for his suffering, so God intervenes to resolve the spiritual issues that surfaced. Job was not punished for sin and Job’s suffering had not cut him off from God, now Job sees the end the point that he cannot have the knowledge to make the assessments he made, so it is wiser to bow in submission and adoration of God than to try to judge him.

Chapter 39 completes the survey of animals that began at Job 38:39 (feeding of the lions and the ravens) with the habits and instincts of the "wild goat", the "wild donkey", and "wild ox" (verses 1–12); then a transitionto the most remarkable of birds, the ostrich (verses 13–18), followed by the horse in a passage of extraordinary fire and brilliancy (verses 19–25), closed by the depiction of remarkable birds, the hawk and eagle (verses 26–30).

Verse 1

[YHWH said:] "Do you know when the mountain goats give birth?
Do you observe the calving of the does?"
"Mountain goats": or "wild goats"; identified with Nubian ibex (Capra nubiana or Capra sinaitica
"Does": or "hinds" (female deer); in parallel to the first statement, here may refer to 'the females of the species of ibex'. 
The ibex can only be observed from distance in the En Gedi area of Israel as the animals resist domestication by humans, but manage to survive with the instinct that God has given.

Verse 9

[YHWH said:] "Will the wild ox be willing to serve you
or spend the night by your manger?"
"Wild ox": generally identified with Aurochs (Bos primigenius), now extinct cattle species (considered to be the wild ancestor of modern domestic cattle), one of the largest herbivores in the Holocene. The last known aurochs herd in the world, which lived in a marshy woodland in Poland's Jaktorów Forest, died in 1627 from natural causes.
Art depictions of aurochs exist since as early as the Paleolithic period (such as cave paintings in Lascaux) also in Egyptian, Ugaritic and Mesopotamian paintings, reliefs and literature (including in the hunting scenes).

See also

Related Bible parts: Job 1, Job 37, Job 38, John 1

References

Sources

External links
 Jewish translations:
 Iyov - Job - Chapter 39 (Judaica Press) translation [with Rashi's commentary] at Chabad.org
 Christian translations:
 Online Bible at GospelHall.org (ESV, KJV, Darby, American Standard Version, Bible in Basic English)
 Book of Job Chapter 39. Various versions
  Various versions

39